The Story So Far is an American pop-punk band from Walnut Creek, California, formed in 2007. They are currently signed to Pure Noise Records and have released 4 studio albums.

History

Formation and early releases (2007–2010)
The Story So Far formed in Walnut Creek, California in 2007. Their name is taken from the New Found Glory song "The Story So Far". The band consisted of Parker Cannon on vocals, Kevin Geyer on lead guitar, Kevin Ambrose on rhythm guitar, Ryan Torf on drums, and Kelen Capener on bass. On December 22, the band released the 5 Songs EP. Ambrose parted ways with the band when he went to college in 2010 and was replaced by William Levy. In March 2010 it was announced the band had signed to Pure Noise. Two months later the band released an EP, While You Were Sleeping (2010). In November, the band released a split with Maker.<ref name=TSSF-Maker>{{cite web|url=https://thestorysofarca.bandcamp.com/album/the-story-so-far-maker-7-split|title=The Story So Far/Maker 7 Split  The Story So Far|work=thestorysofarca.bandcamp.com|access-date=August 31, 2015}}</ref>

Under Soil and Dirt, What You Don't See and Songs Of EP (2011–2014)

Barrett Records released a split of The Story So Far and Morgan Foster in May 2011. Pure Noise released the band's debut album Under Soil and Dirt in June. On March 26, 2013, they released their second studio album, What You Don't See, which debuted at number 46 on the Billboard 200 chart in the U.S. They have also released a split with Stick to Your Guns on June 18. This split contains one new original song, Clairvoyant, and a cover of Pinback's song "Loro". The band was featured on the cover of Alternative Press' March 2013 issue "100 Bands You Need to Know." The band played the entire Warped Tour 2014 on the main stage.

On April 24, 2014, The Story So Far announced they would be releasing Songs Of, an acoustic EP on June 17 through Pure Noise. The record contains some acoustic versions of previous songs, as well as one new original song ("Navy Blue") and a Bob Marley cover.

The Story So Far (2015–2016)

On January 5, 2015, a video titled "The Story So Far Album Teaser #1" was uploaded on the band's official YouTube channel. The video shows multiple clips of the band members with friends goofing around and having fun. At the end of the video a text roll appears, saying "We are writing a new record stay tuned..." On February 23, 2015 a video titled "The Story So Far Album teaser #2" was uploaded on the same channel, showing behind the scenes-footage of the making of the album. On March 15, the band announced their self-titled album would be released on May 18, 2015. "Solo" and "Heavy Gloom" were uploaded to YouTube soon after. On May 11, the band released their full album to stream on their website ahead of the release date of May 19.

Proper Dose (2017–present) 
The band reportedly entered the studio to record their fourth studio album in April 2017. On September 13, 2017, the band released the song "Out of It". The track is included on a charity 7" vinyl, which was released on November 3.

The album, titled Proper Dose, was officially announced on July 12, 2018, and was released on September 21, 2018. Proper Dose debuted at number 19 on the Billboard 200 chart, but quickly declined, falling off the chart the following week. In efforts to promote the album, the band embarked on a European tour with supporting acts from Citizen and All Get Out. At the conclusion of their European tour, the band immediately started a U.S. tour with Movements, Citizen, and Turnover. On September 21, 2018 the band released their first music video from Proper Dose for their song "Upside Down", followed by music videos for "Take Me As You Please" and "Proper Dose" on November 8, 2018 and January 22, 2019, respectively.

On May 31, 2022, bassist Kelen Capener announced on his Twitter page that he was no longer a member of the band; no explanation was given for his departure.

StyleUnder Soil and Dirt (2011), What You Don't See (2013), and The Story So Far (2015) have all been described as pop-punk. With their fourth album, Proper Dose, marking a departure from pop punk and saw the band incorporating indie rock into their sound. The Story So Far has also been described as having an "edgier" take on pop punk, due to their frequent incorporation of hardcore punk and punk rock elements in their music.

Discography

Studio albums
 Under Soil and Dirt (2011)
 What You Don't See (2013) 
 The Story So Far (2015)
 Proper Dose'' (2018)

Members

Current members
 Parker Cannon – lead vocals (2007–present)
 Kevin Geyer – lead guitar, backing and occasional co-lead vocals (2007–present), keyboards (2018–present)
 Ryan Torf – bass guitar (2022–present), keyboards (2015–present), drums, percussion (2007–2022)
 Will Levy – rhythm guitar, backing vocals (2010–present)

Current touring musicians
 Mikey Ambrose – drums (2022–present)

Former members
 Kevin Ambrose – rhythm guitar (2007–2010)
 Kelen Capener – bass guitar (2007–2022)

Former touring musicians
 Morgan Foster – bass guitar (2011–2012)
 Ryan Justice – drums (2011)
 Cameron Macbain – drums (2011–2012)
 Bo McDowell – rhythm guitar (2010)

Timeline

References

External links

 
 The Story So Far on Facebook

Musical groups established in 2007
Alternative rock groups from California
Musical groups from California
Pop punk groups from California
People from Walnut Creek, California
Pure Noise Records artists